Lance Cargill (born September 13, 1971) is an American lawyer and Republican politician from the U.S. state of Oklahoma. Cargill served as Speaker of the Oklahoma House of Representatives from January 2, 2007, to January 28, 2008. He resigned his leadership role due to tax and ethics controversies and was succeeded as speaker by Chris Benge.

Since leaving the Oklahoma legislature, Cargill has neither run for nor held an elective office. He has shifted his focus to serving as a political consultant. He has formed various partnerships, and is headquartered in his hometown of Harrah (a suburb of Oklahoma City). Mostly, he seems to promote lesser-known Republican candidates who share is very strong conservative views.

Early life
Cargill was born and raised in Harrah, Oklahoma, where he attended Harrah Public Schools. After graduating from high school, Cargill moved to Stillwater, Oklahoma, where he attended Oklahoma State University–Stillwater. He graduated with a Bachelor of Science degree. He then attended the Vanderbilt University Law School and earned a Juris Doctor.

Political career
Cargill was first elected to the Oklahoma House in 2000 and served four terms in that body. In 2004, he won his re-election with more than 70% of the vote. In December 2006, Cargill was selected by his party to serve as the Speaker of the Oklahoma House of Representatives. He was formally elected on the constitutionally-mandated organizational day on January 2, 2007.  At the time of his election, Cargill was the youngest state house speaker in the United States.

One of Cargill's noteworthy achievements was to head up a 100 ideas Oklahoma campaign.

Resignation as speaker after tax, ethics problems
On January 28, 2008, following heavy criticism for his failure to pay state taxes in a timely manner and questions about questionable fundraising activities by a PAC he led in 2006, Cargill resigned as Speaker of the House. In a press release, he stated that news accounts about his personal issues were overshadowing the important work ahead for legislators. He remained in the Legislature as a state representative, and did not file for re-election to his seat in 2008.

On August 29, 2009, the Oklahoma Ethics Commission publicly reprimanded both Cargill and the Oklahoma County Republican Party for their role in the controversial PAC.

Post-speakership political activity
Cargill has neither held nor run for elective office since leaving the speakership. Instead, he has acted as a political consultant, frequently assisting other Republicans vying for state offices. A news article in 2013, identified him as an example of many former candidates, who had not filed the required quarterly reports regarding their campaign finance activities for each campaign. Each candidate is required by law to file the quarterly "Statement of Inactivity" until a final statement is issued officially closing the campaign.

The Temple Daily Telegram reported in 2015, that Lance Cargill (former Oklahoma state Speaker of the House) was serving as political consultant to Christopher "C.J." Grisham of Temple, who was a candidate for Texas Senate District 24.

See also
51st Oklahoma Legislature

Notes

References

1971 births
Living people
Politicians from Oklahoma City
Oklahoma State University alumni
Vanderbilt University alumni
Republican Party members of the Oklahoma House of Representatives
Lawyers from Oklahoma City
21st-century American politicians
Speakers of the Oklahoma House of Representatives